Professional boxing in New Zealand refers to the sport of boxing held in New Zealand at a professional level.

Governing body
New Zealand National Boxing Federation (NZNBF) and New Zealand Professional Boxing Association (NZPBA) are the national sporting commissioning bodies that run professional boxing in New Zealand. Other boxing bodies in New Zealand have been inactive including Boxing NZ Inc and New Zealand Boxing Council (NZBC). Boxing NZ Inc currently only commission amateur boxing events and NZBC has been inactive since 2007. The New Zealand Boxing Association (NZBA) was the first boxing commission in New Zealand, which began before 1900. In 1903, the NZBA was granted a special dispensation by the ruling world amateur body to conduct professional boxing.  Thus was born the amateur undercard with pro bouts as the main card. In 2016, a New Boxing commission started called the Professional Boxing Commission New Zealand (PBCNZ). The PBCNZ commissioned their first show on Joseph Parker vs. Andy Ruiz. A small commissioning body called Pro-Box NZ (established in 2012), is semi active in New Zealand, however only does an average of three events per year. Most of Pro-Box NZ commissioned events are in the Bay of Plenty and Waikato area. In 2019, NZPBA was no longer considered the main professional boxing body as Pro Box NZ did more shows nationwide the NZPBA. PBCNZ was the main body for Auckland.

History
In 1903 Parliament formed and passed the Boxing and Wrestling Act to cover the facets and the issuing of a Police boxing permit. The act and regulations have been slightly amended over the years. The latest amendment was 1984, because only boxing and wrestling is named in the current act and regulations, is why all the other combat sports do not have to apply for Police permits or restricted by anything else such that is required for current day boxers.

Tournaments
Super Eight Boxing Tournament

Current champions

Men

Female

Pacific Titles
In 2018, Pro Box NZ created a new title for the pacific region called the Pro Box Pacific title, with the first bout happening on 4 May 2018 with Bowyn Morgan taking on Andres Delfin Rodriguez. PBCNZ tried to replicate the idea, however the original bout scheduled on 19 May 2018, between Sam Rapira and Abhay Chand did not happen due to Abhay Chand pulling out. Sam Rapira ended up fighting Ratu Dawai instead for the PBCNZ National Titles.

Cruiserweight Pacific title

Light Heavyweight Pacific title

Super Middleweight Pacific title

Middleweight Pacific title

Super Welterweight Pacific title

Super Lightweight Pacific title

Super Featherweight Pacific title

Provincial titles
In 2018, New Zealand Professional Boxing Association created three Provincial titles for New Zealand. The NZPBA Northern, NZPBA Central and NZPBA Southern title. The first title was competed on 6 October 2018, where Kiki Toa Leutele Knocked out Thomas Russell.

Heavyweight title

Heavyweight Central title

Heavyweight Southern title

Cruiserweight title

Cruiserweight Southern title

Super Middleweight title

Super Middleweight Southern title

Middleweight title

Middleweight Northern title

Middleweight Central title

Middleweight Southern title

Lightweight title

Lightweight Northern title

Boxing and Wrestling Act 1981

See also
List of New Zealand female boxing champions
List of New Zealand heavyweight boxing champions
List of New Zealand cruiserweight boxing champions
List of New Zealand light heavyweight boxing champions
List of New Zealand super middleweight boxing champions
List of New Zealand middleweight boxing champions
List of New Zealand super welterweight boxing champions
List of New Zealand welterweight boxing champions
List of New Zealand super lightweight boxing champions
List of New Zealand lightweight boxing champions
List of New Zealand super featherweight boxing champions
List of New Zealand featherweight boxing champions
List of New Zealand bantamweight boxing champions
List of Australian female boxing champions
List of Australian heavyweight boxing champions
List of Australian cruiserweight boxing champions
List of Australian light heavyweight boxing champions
List of Australian super middleweight boxing champions
List of Australian middleweight boxing champions
List of Australian super welterweight boxing champions
List of Australian welterweight boxing champions
List of Australian super lightweight boxing champions
List of Australian lightweight boxing champions
List of Australian super featherweight boxing champions
List of Australian featherweight boxing champions
List of Australian bantamweight boxing champions
Boxing in Australia

References

External links
NZPBA Official Website
PBCNZ Official Website

Boxing in New Zealand